Meliorchis caribea is an extinct, early to middle Miocene orchid known only from a packet of pollen attached to the wing of a stingless bee, Proplebeia dominicana, trapped in Dominican amber. It was the first fossil orchid ever described, and allowed for a revised estimate of the time of origin of the Orchidaceae to the Mesozoic. Morphology of the pollinium suggests that M. caribea is closely related to the modern genus Ligeophila.

References 

 Pridgeon, A.M., Cribb, P.J., Chase, M.A. & Rasmussen, F. eds. (1999). Genera Orchidacearum 1. Oxford Univ. Press.
 Pridgeon, A.M., Cribb, P.J., Chase, M.A. & Rasmussen, F. eds. (2001). Genera Orchidacearum 2. Oxford Univ. Press.
 Pridgeon, A.M., Cribb, P.J., Chase, M.A. & Rasmussen, F. eds. (2003). Genera Orchidacearum 3. Oxford Univ. Press
 Berg Pana, H. 2005. Handbuch der Orchideen-Namen. Dictionary of Orchid Names. Dizionario dei nomi delle orchidee. Ulmer, Stuttgart

Goodyerinae
Miocene plants
Monotypic Orchidoideae genera
Cranichideae genera
Prehistoric angiosperm genera